Styloleptus cubanus is a species of beetle in the family Cerambycidae. It was described by Fisher in 1926.

References

Styloleptus
Beetles described in 1926